Ladies Who Punch: The Explosive Inside Story of "The View" is a 2019 non-fiction book by entertainment journalist Ramin Setoodeh about the American day time talk show The View. The book landed on the [[New York Times’ Bestseller list|New York Times''' Bestseller list]] for within its first week of release.

Background
Author Ramin Setoodeh, a writer for Variety, said the idea for the book came from noticing the large amount of traffic that stories about The View received on Variety's website. He spent three years researching the book, and conducted dozens of interviews including 11 current and former co-hosts of the show. 

Content
The book tells the story of The View'', its impact on American culture, and many controversial moments throughout the show's history.

Reception
Rosie O'Donnell stated that she regretted being interviewed for the book.

References

2019 non-fiction books
English-language books